Katherine Read (born 30 June 1969), also known by her married name Katherine Osher, is an English former backstroke swimmer who competed at three Olympic Games, in Los Angeles 1984, Seoul 1988 and Barcelona 1992. She holds the record of 42 National titles

Career

Olympic Games
Read competed at her first Olympic Games in Los Angeles 1984 at the age of 15 and reached the B final of the 200 m backstroke, finishing 11th overall. Two years later at the 1986 Commonwealth Games in Edinburgh, Scotland, she won a silver medal in the 200 m backstroke. At her second Olympic Games in Seoul 1988, Read reached the B finals of both the 100 m and 200m backstroke, overall she finished 16th and 12th respectively. At her final Olympics in Barcelona 1992, she was eliminated in the heats, finishing 24th overall in the  100 m and 21st in the 200m backstroke events. She competed at the 1996 Olympic trials, but failed to make the team for Atlanta.

European Championships
During her career, Read also reached six individual finals at the European Championships, 8th at 200 m (1987), 7th at both 100 m  & 200 m (1989), 6th at 200 m (1991) and 6th at both 100 & 200 m (1993). It was at the 1993 European Championships event in Sheffield that she finally won a European Championship medal, winning bronze in the medley relay along with teammates Jaime King, Nicola Kennedy and Karen Pickering.

Commonwealth Games
She represented England and won a silver medal in the 200 metres backstroke, at the 1986 Commonwealth Games in Edinburgh, Scotland. Four years later she represented England in the 100 metres and 200 metres backstroke events, at the 1990 Commonwealth Games in Auckland, New Zealand. At the  1994 Commonwealth Games in Victoria (as Kathy Osher), she won two medals, bronze in the 100 m backstroke, followed by a silver in the medley relay.

National Championships
Her record of 42 ASA National Championship titles includes 29 senior titles (26 backstroke titles (5 x 50 metres backstroke), (10 x 100 metres backstroke), (11 x 200 metres backstroke) and (3 medley titles (1 x 200 metres medley), (2 x 400 metres medley).

International competitions

References

1969 births
Living people
English female swimmers
Olympic swimmers of Great Britain
Swimmers at the 1984 Summer Olympics
Swimmers at the 1988 Summer Olympics
Swimmers at the 1992 Summer Olympics
Female backstroke swimmers
Commonwealth Games silver medallists for England
Commonwealth Games medallists in swimming
Swimmers at the 1986 Commonwealth Games
Swimmers at the 1990 Commonwealth Games
Swimmers at the 1994 Commonwealth Games
Medallists at the 1986 Commonwealth Games
Medallists at the 1994 Commonwealth Games